Kenrick Prescot, D.D. (7 July 1703, Chester – 3 August 1779, Cambridge) was a priest and academic in the second half of the 18th century.

Prescot was educated at Charterhouse and St Catharine's College, Cambridge, graduating BA in 1724, M.A.in 1727 and B.D. in 1738. He was Fellow of St Catharine's from 1727 to 1741 and its Master from 1741 to his death.  He was vice-chancellor of the University of Cambridge from 1744 to 1745. Yates was ordained on 24 September 1727. His first post was as curate  at Stapleford, Cambridgeshire. He held livings at Hartland, Coton and Yarmouth; and was a prebendary of Norwich Cathedral.

References

Vice-Chancellors of the University of Cambridge

1703 births
1779 deaths
Alumni of St Catharine's College, Cambridge
Fellows of St Catharine's College, Cambridge
Masters of St Catharine's College, Cambridge
People from Chester
18th-century English Anglican priests
People educated at Charterhouse School